Anton Skachkov is a Paralympian athlete from Ukraine competing mainly in category F46 long and triple jump events.

He finished the Cherkasy National University (2005).

Anton competed in the 2000 Summer Paralympics winning silver in both the long jump and triple jump.  In the 2008 Summer Paralympics he went better in both events winning gold in the long jump and triple jump.

References

Paralympic athletes of Ukraine
Athletes (track and field) at the 2000 Summer Paralympics
Athletes (track and field) at the 2004 Summer Paralympics
Paralympic gold medalists for Ukraine
Paralympic silver medalists for Ukraine
Ukrainian male long jumpers
Ukrainian male triple jumpers
Living people
Medalists at the 2000 Summer Paralympics
Medalists at the 2004 Summer Paralympics
Year of birth missing (living people)
Paralympic medalists in athletics (track and field)
Long jumpers with limb difference
Triple jumpers with limb difference
Paralympic long jumpers
Paralympic triple jumpers